The FIBA Saporta Cup records are the records of the now defunct European-wide second-tier level professional club basketball competition, the FIBA Saporta Cup.

Top 10 scoring performances in finals games
The 10 highest individual single-game scoring performances in FIBA Saporta Cup Finals games.

Players with the most Saporta Cup championships
Players that won the most FIBA Saporta Cup championships.

Head coaches with multiple Saporta Cup championships
Head coaches that won multiple FIBA Saporta Cup championships.

See also
FIBA Saporta Cup
FIBA Saporta Cup Finals
FIBA Saporta Cup Finals MVP
FIBA Saporta Cup Finals Top Scorer
FIBA Saporta Cup Top Scorer
FIBA Festivals
FIBA EuroStars

References

External links
FIBA Saporta Cup @ FIBA Europe.com
FIBA Saporta Cup Winners 
FIBA Saporta Cup @ LinguaSport.com

Records